Geeta Dutt (born Geeta Ghosh Roy Chowdhuri; 23 November 1930 – 20 July 1972) was an Indian playback singer and a famous Hindi and Bengali classical artist, born in Faridpur before the Partition of India. She found particular prominence as a playback singer in Hindi cinema. She is considered as one of the best playback singers of all time in Hindi films. She also sang many modern Bengali songs, both in the film and non-film genre.

Early life
Geeta Ghosh Roy Chowdhuri was one of 10 children born to a wealthy Zamindar family in a village named Idilpur, Madaripur Subdivision (presently under Gosairhat Upzilla of Shariatpur District, Bangladesh), formerly under Faridpur district in Bengal, British India. Her family moved to Calcutta and Assam in the early 1940s, leaving behind their land and properties. In 1942, her parents moved to an apartment in Bombay. Geeta was twelve and continued her schooling at the Bengali High School.

Singing career

K. Hanuman Prasad took Geeta under his patronage, trained and groomed her in singing and later launched her into singing for movies. In 1946, she got the first break with an opportunity to sing in the mythological film Bhakta Prahlad for which Prasad was the music director. She was given two lines to sing for two songs. She was sixteen at that time.

Personal life
During Geeta's recording of songs for the movie Baazi, she met its young up-and-coming director, Guru Dutt. Their romance culminated in marriage on 26 May 1953. Together they had three children: Tarun (1954–1985), Arun (1956–2014) and Nina (b. 1964). 

She also cut a number non-film discs, singing to the tune of notable music directors like Sudhin Dasgupta and Anal Chatterjee.

In 1957, Guru Dutt launched the film Gauri with Geeta Dutt as its singing star. It was to be India's first movie in cinemascope but the project was shelved after just a few days of the shooting. By then, Guru Dutt had got romantically involved with Waheeda Rehman and Geeta had taken to drinking. The break up of their marriage affected Geeta's singing career. 

In 1958, S.D. Burman had developed discord with Lata Mangeshkar as a playback singer and he attempted to work with Geeta as the main singer of his compositions rather than the upcoming Asha Bhosle who, he felt, was relatively raw. However, out of her personal problems, Geeta would not practice her art sufficiently and failed to meet Burman's demanding standards. He and O.P. Nayyar then started to work with Asha and helped her blossom as a singer. 

In 1964, Guru Dutt died from a combination of alcohol and an overdose of sleeping pills. (His death was widely perceived as a suicide following two earlier attempts). This shattered Geeta, who then suffered a serious nervous breakdown and ran into financial problems. She tried to resume her singing career, cutting discs at Durgā Pujā and giving stage shows. She performed a leading role in a Bengali movie, Badhu Baran (1967), and sang admirably in  Anubhav (1971), to the music of Kanu Roy.  Geeta Dutt's final performance  was for Midnight in 1972 (unreleased) Two duets, one which was with Talat  Mehmood.

Death
Geeta Dutt died on 20 July 1972 due to cirrhosis of liver at the age of 41 in Mumbai, Maharashtra. She was survived by her three children and siblings.

Notable songs

She has sung over 1417 songs in Hindi films. In addition, she has sung songs in many other Indian languages including Marathi, Gujarati, Bengali, Maithili, Bhojpuri and Punjabi. She has sung in Nepali evergreen movie Maitighar.

Some of the songs sung under S. D. Burman's direction:

 "Mera Sundar Sapna Beet Gaya" (Do Bhai – 1947 )
 "Woh Sapne Waali Raat" (Pyaar – 1950)
 "Tadbir Se Bigdi Hui Taqdeer" (Baazi – 1951)
 "Aan Milo Aan Milo" (Devdas – 1955 ) With Manna Dey
 "Aaj Sajan Mohe Ang Lagalo" (Pyaasa – 1957)
 " Jane kya tune kahi" (Pyaasa – 1957)
 "Hum Aap Ke Aankhon Main" (Pyaasa – 1957) with Mohd. Rafi
 "Hawa Dhire Aana" (Sujata – 1959)
 "Waqt Ne Kiya Kya Haseen Sitam" (Kaagaz Ke Phool – 1959)
 "Janu janu re" (Insaan Jaag Utha) with Asha Bhosle

Some of the songs she sang under O. P. Nayyar's direction:

 "Zara Saamne Aa" (Baaz – 1953)
 "Babuji Dhire Chalna" (Aar Paar – 1954)
 "Thandi Hawa Kali Ghata" (Mr. & Mrs. '55 – 1955)
 "Jaane Kahan Mera Jigar Gaya Ji" (Mr. & Mrs. '55 – 1955)
 "Jab Badal Lehraya" (Chhoomantar – 1956)
 "Mere Zindagi Ke Humsafar" (Shrimati 420 – 1956)
 "Jaata Kahan Hai" (CID – 1956)
 "Aye Dil Hain Mushkil" (Aka "Bombay Meri Jaan") (CID – 1956), With Mohammed Rafi
 "Chor, Lutere, Daku" (Ustad – 1957)
 "Mera Naam Chin Chin Chu" (Howrah Bridge – 1958)
 "Kaisa Jadoo Balam Tune Dara" (12 O'clock – 1958)

Some of the songs sung under Hemant Kumar's direction

 "Jai Jagadish Hare" Composed By A Sanskrit Poet Jayadeva Circa 1200 AD (Anand Math - 1951)
 "Na Jao Saiyaan Chhuda Ke Baiyaan" (Sahib Bibi Aur Ghulam – 1962)
 "Kaise Roko Ge Aise Toofan Ko" (Anandmath – 1952 ) With Talat Mahmood
 "Madbhari Hain Pyar Ki Palken" (Fashion – 1957)
 "Na Yeh Chand Ho Ga" (Shart – 1954)
 "Piya Aiso Jiya Mein Samaye Gayo" (Sahib Bibi Aur Ghulam – 1962)
 "Chale Aao Chale Aao" (Sahib Bibi Aur Ghulam – 1962)

Madan Mohan's direction
 "Aye Dil Mujhe Bata De'"(Bhai Bhai – 1956)

For movie Anubhav (1971)
 "Mujhe Jaan Nah Kaho Meri Jaan" (Anubhav – 1971) Music: Kanu Roy
 "Mera Dil Jo Mera Hota" (Anubhav – 1971) Music: Kanu Roy
 "Koi Chupke Se Aake" (Anubhav – 1971) Music: Kanu Roy

Several songs from Jogan:
 "Ghunghat Ke Pat Khol"
 "Mein Tou Girdhar Ke Ghar Jaon"
 "Mat Ja Mat Ja Jogi"
 "Dag Mag Dag Mag Dole Naiya"
 "Mein Tou Prem Diwani"

Some Bengali songs:

 'Shachimata Go Char Juge Hai' (1950)
   Baalo (1951) ( Punjabi Film ) : Kothe Kothe Aa Kudiye : Music  N Dutta : L Sahir Ludhiyanvi
 'Ekhan-O Dustar Lajja' (1952)
 'Ei Sundar Swarnali Sandhyay' (Hospital, 1960; Music: Amal Mukherjee)
 'Katha Achhe Tumi Aj Asbe (Kanu Ghosh 1960)
 'Ei Mayabi Tithi' (Shonar Horin, 1959; Music: Hemant Mukherjee)
 'Tumi Je Amar' (Harano Sur, 1958; Music: Hemant Kumar)
 'Nishi Raat Banka Chand Aakashe'  (Prithibi Aamare Chaay, 1957; Music: Nachiketa Ghosh)
 'Jhanak Jhanak Kanak Kankan Baaje' (Indrani, 1958; Music : Nachiketa Ghosh)
 ' Sundar, jano na ki.....' ( Indrani, 1958; Music : Nachiketa Ghosh)
 ' Nir chhoto kshati nei ' [duet with Hemanta Mukherjee]( Indrani, 1958; Music : Nachiketa Ghosh)
 ' Kancher churir chhata' ( Dak Harkara; Music : Sudhin Dasgupta)

A few Bengali songs of non-film genre:

 ' Kato gaan haralam tomar majhe ' (Music : Anal Chatterjee)
 ' Krishnachura aagun tumi ' (Music : Sudhin Dasgupta)
 ' Ektu chaoya, ektu paoya ' (Music : Sudhin Dasgupta)
 '..Aay aay moynamotir ganye ' (Music : Kanu Roy)

Government recognition

Postage stamps featuring Dutt were issued by India Post in 2013 and 2016.

References

External links

Listen some selected songs by Geeta Dutt 
Geeta Dutt: Hindi cinema's skylark who enthralled millions

1930 births
1972 deaths
Deaths from cirrhosis
Indian women playback singers
Indian film actresses
Bengali playback singers
People from Faridpur District
Bollywood playback singers
Bengali singers
Nepali-language singers from India
20th-century Indian actresses
20th-century Indian singers
Alcohol-related deaths in India
20th-century Indian women singers

hif:23 November
Madaripur District